Micropterix cassinella is a species of moth belonging to the family Micropterigidae. It was described by Michael A. Kurz, Marion E. Kurz and Hans Christof Zeller-Lukashort in 2010 and is endemic to Italy. At present, it is only known from the provinces of Lazio and Campagna in the central Apennines.

Adults are on wing from May to late July, depending on the altitude. Adults were found swarming around tall herbaceous vegetation and around flowers of Pistacia lentiscus.

References

Micropterigidae
Moths described in 2010
Endemic fauna of Italy
Moths of Europe